Zelazny or Żelazny is a surname. Notable people with the surname include:

Erwin Zelazny (born 1991), French footballer
Eryk Żelazny (born 1943), Polish runner
Mary Lou Zelazny (born 1956), American painter
Roger Zelazny (1937–1995), American writer
Trent Zelazny (born 1976), American author

See also
 
 Zelezny (disambiguation)

Polish-language surnames